Highway 201 (AR 201, Ark. 201, and Hwy. 201)  is a north–south state highway in Baxter County, Arkansas. The route runs  from Arkansas Highway 341 in Salesville north to the Missouri state line through Mountain Home, the county seat of Baxter County.

Route description

AR 201 begins in Salesville at Push Mountain Road. The highway runs west to Shady Grove, when it curves north to Mountain Home. Upon reaching Mountain Home, AR 201 intersects US 62/US 412 before the lone AR 201 spur leaves the main route. AR 201 continues north as S College Street past the Casey House until intersecting 9th Street. A concurrency forms east then north through downtown Mountain Home. AR 5/AR 201 intersect and follow US 62B for six blocks north, passing the Mountain Home Commercial Historic District and Baxter County Courthouse, both on the National Register of Historic Places. The routes run together as Hickory Street when AR 5/AR 201 branch west and US 62B stays east. Shortly after this fork, AR 201 departs AR 5 and heads due north. The highway runs through north Mountain Home and exits town, becoming a winding rural route. AR 201 runs through the unincorporated community of Clarkridge near the Missouri state line, when the road becomes state supplemental route J.

History
The first portion of Highway 201 was from Mountain Home to Missouri, and was designated on July 10, 1957. The highway was entirely gravel. The southern half of this segment was paved in 1961. The highway was extended south to Salesville in 1963. The entire northern segment was paved to the Missouri state line the following year. The entire southern portion was paved by 1979.

Major intersections
Mile markers reset at concurrencies.

|-
|-

Mountain Home spur

See also
 
 
 List of state highways in Arkansas

References

External links

201
Transportation in Baxter County, Arkansas